Top Gear America is a motoring television series for BBC America hosted by William Fichtner, Tom Ford and Antron Brown. Based on the UK version, the new program was announced in April 2017. The eight-episode first season premiered on July 30, 2017.

On April 10, 2019, it was announced that a reboot of the series was in the works. On December 3, 2019, it was revealed that Dax Shepard, Rob Corddry, and Jethro Bovingdon would be the hosts of the revival, and premiered on MotorTrend+ in 2021. However, due to the COVID-19 pandemic, production was delayed and production finally wrapped in Fall 2020.

Format 
The format and segments of the show follows the original UK version: studio segments, car reviews, celebrity guests, challenges, power laps and races. However, following the broadcast of the first episode, the show was criticised for its similarity to the UK version.

Development 
A previous American version of Top Gear was broadcast on History from November 2010 until June 2016. Following a second revamp of the UK version in 2017, BBC America announced that Top Gear would return to the United States in late 2017 as a new show, now titled Top Gear America, to be hosted by actor William Fichtner. Later that month, it was confirmed that British journalist and television host Tom Ford and American drag racer Antron Brown would be Fichtner's co-hosts.

Network president, Sarah Barnett, commented, "We are big fans of the mix of cars, credibility and charisma that adds up to the winning formula for Top Gear, and couldn't be happier that BBCA is now the home for the franchise in the United States, with Top Gear America joining the original show on our network, Bill, Antron and Wookie are serious gear heads who never take themselves too seriously. It will be quite the trip."

Episodes of Top Gear America were broadcast on Sunday in the same time slot as the British version. Following a series of teaser trailers featuring The Stig being shipped to and exploring the United States., the first trailer for the show was released by BBC America on June 29, 2017. That same day, the logo for the first season was unveiled, which features the three hosts and The Stig.

Studio and timed celebrity track segments were filmed on location in Las Vegas at Speedvegas.

Episodes

Season 1 (2017)

Season 2 (2021)

Season 3 (2022)

References

External links 
  (MotorTrend+)
  (BBC America)

2010s American television series
2017 American television series debuts
2020s American television series
American television series based on British television series
American television series revived after cancellation
BBC America original programming
English-language television shows
Television series by BBC Studios
Top Gear